Ormakalil is an upcoming Indian Malayalam-language family thriller film written, produced and directed by M. Vishwa Pratap.
 It stars Shankar as DIG and Deepa Kartha in the main roles supported by Shaju Sreedhar, Poojitha Menon, Nasser Latif and Vijayakumari. Joy Maxwell composed Music and cinematography by Nithin K Raj.

Plot
Whoever we are, whatever we are, life has its own journey. We all have to travel along with that. That is the journey of life. A mother's love and affection for her children are endless and it cannot be measured. It is an endless regard. A mother has more affection than anybody else for her children. It's all about a mother's passion.

The story travels parallelly on both tracks (ie) the journey of life and a mother's passion. A complete family story, scene by scene - suspense, sentiments and
philosophies - highly built up.

The plot of the movie 'Ormakalil' - a mother's passion revolves around surviving life situations. The shooting took place in the scenic locations of Kanyakumari district.

Cast
 
 Shankar as DIG Raj Mohan
 Shaju Sreedhar as Devan
 Deepa Kartha as Veena Balachandran
 Nasser Latif as Pratap Chandran
 Poojitha Menon as Reshmi
 Vijayakumari as Lakshmi Amma

Music
Music of the movie directed by Joy Maxwell and Lyrics written by M. Vishwa Pratap with vocals by Sujatha Mohan and Jassie Gift

References
 

2022 films
2022 thriller films
Indian family films
Indian thriller films
2020s Malayalam-language films